Thomas Henry McGrattan (born October 19, 1927) is a Canadian former ice hockey goaltender who played in one National Hockey League game for the Detroit Red Wings during the 1947–48 season, on November 9, 1947 against the Toronto Maple Leafs. The rest of his career, which lasted from 1946 to 1950, was spent in the minor leagues.

Career statistics

Regular season and playoffs

See also
 List of players who played only one game in the NHL

External links
 

1927 births
Living people
Canadian ice hockey goaltenders
Detroit Bright's Goodyears players
Detroit Hettche players
Detroit Red Wings players
Galt Red Wings players
Ice hockey people from Ontario
Ontario Hockey Association Senior A League (1890–1979) players
Sportspeople from Brantford
Stratford Kroehlers players
Windsor Spitfires players